Let It Go is song by American hip hop recording artist Wiz Khalifa, featuring vocals from singer Akon, from the Khalifa's second studio album O.N.I.F.C. (2012).

Charts

References

Akon songs
Wiz Khalifa songs
Songs written by Wiz Khalifa
2011 songs